A fire destroyed much of Augusta, Georgia on March 22, 1916. Photographs captured the event. The fire was blamed on an unattended iron in a tailor's shop. It was the worst fire in Augusta's history and impacted 25 blocks from 8th Street to East Boundary Street, including portions of downtown and Olde Town. No one was killed, but Augusta incurred $10 million in damages. Many thousands of cotton bales were destroyed and an estimated 3,000 people made homeless. Approximately 600 residential and commercial buildings were destroyed. A residential area became a lot with only chimneys left. "Cotton Row" was destroyed. The Lamar Building was under construction and had to be demolished after the fire. Churches and schools were destroyed.

The response 
Due to the size of the large fire, fire departments from neighboring cities responded to include Atlanta, Savannah, Columbia, Macon, Greenville, Waynesboro, and Charleston.

Gallery

References

Fire
Augusta
Augusta
1916 in Georgia (U.S. state)